Dumbea is a genus of leaf beetles in the subfamily Eumolpinae. It is known from the South Province and Mont Panié of New Caledonia, and is named after Dumbéa, a town nearby Nouméa. This name was originally used by the French entomologist Charles Adolphe Albert Fauvel to house several species of Eumolpinae from New Caledonia, but Fauvel's Dumbea was unpublished and is a nomen nudum. The genus was established based on general proportions and body size, and may be polyphyletic or paraphyletic.

Species
 Dumbea gigas Jolivet, Verma & Mille, 2007
 Dumbea montana Jolivet, Verma & Mille, 2011
 Dumbea paulaudi Jolivet, Verma & Mille, 2007
 Dumbea striata Jolivet, Verma & Mille, 2007

References

Eumolpinae
Chrysomelidae genera
Insects of New Caledonia
Beetles of Oceania
Endemic fauna of New Caledonia